Đặng Thụy (1649–1735) was a Vietnamese official of Revival Lê dynasty.

Biography
Đặng Thụy has a courtesy name Đình Tướng (廷相), pseudonym Trúc Trai Fairy Oldman (竹齋仙翁), nick name Fairy National Oldman (仙國老). He was born in 1649 at Lương Xá village, Chương Đức district, Ứng Thiên prefect, Nam Thượng town. His father was Duke Trịnh Liễu and his grandfather was general Đặng Thế Tài, his forefather was Đặng Huấn who entered the restoration of the Lê dynasty. Lương Xá village's Đặng clan has been fathered by general Đặng Dung.

Works

 Trúc Ông phụng sứ tập (竹翁奉使集)
 Linh Giang doanh vệ lục
 Thuật cổ quy huấn lục
 Dưỡng đức tính (養德性)
 Thì triều thị
 Thân chính nhân
 Sùng chính học (崇政學)
 Viễn nữ sắc (遠好色)
 Trạch bộc ngự
 Giới kiêu xa
 Biện trung nịnh

See also
 Nguyễn Quý Đức

References

 Đặng Thụy in ThiVien
 Phan Huy Chú (2008), Lịch triều hiến chương loại chí, tập 1, Nhà xuất bản Giáo dục
 Viện Sử học (2007), Lịch sử Việt Nam, tập 3, Nhà xuất bản Giáo dục
 Đặng Tộc Đại Tông Phả, Yến Quận công Đặng Tiến Thự viết năm 1683, Tiến sĩ Ứng Quận công Đặng Đình Tướng tục biên năm 1686, Thái Nhạc Quận công Đặng Sĩ Hàn tiếp tục tục biên năm 1745, Nguyễn Văn Thành giới thiệu, Nhà xuất bản Văn hóa Thông tin 2002
 Khoa bảng trạng nguyên Việt Nam
 (清)鄧廷相

1649 births
1735 deaths
People from Hanoi
Vietnamese Confucianists
Vietnamese male poets
Lê dynasty officials